The 9th constituency of Seine-et-Marne is a French legislative constituency in the Seine-et-Marne département.

Description

The 9th constituency of Seine-et-Marne lies in the centre of the department but borders the so-called Petite-Couronne of the inner Paris urban area.

Like its neighbouring seats 9th has historically swung between left and right. It, however, remained in the hands of the conservative UMP for three consecutive elections since 2002 until 2017.

Historic Representation

Election results

2022

 
 
 
 
 
 
 
|-
| colspan="8" bgcolor="#E9E9E9"|
|-

2017

 
 
 
 
 
 
 
|-
| colspan="8" bgcolor="#E9E9E9"|
|-

2012

Sources

Official results of French elections from 2002: "Résultats électoraux officiels en France" (in French).

9